Christopher Marcus Rollinson (25 May 1928 – 7 April 1988) was a New Zealand boxer.

Rollinson represented his country at the 1950 British Empire Games in Auckland. He reached the final of the light heavyweight division, where he won the silver medal. The referee stopped the contest after Rollinson was knocked down three times in the first round by his opponent, Don Scott, of England.

Rollinson died on 7 April 1988.

References

1928 births
1988 deaths
Boxers at the 1950 British Empire Games
Commonwealth Games silver medallists for New Zealand
New Zealand male boxers
Commonwealth Games medallists in boxing
Light-heavyweight boxers
Medallists at the 1950 British Empire Games